Friedrich Wilhelm Ernst Busch (22 January 1900 – 8 June 1980) was a German singer and actor.

Biography
Busch originated from a Kiel worker family. He started in life as a shipyard worker before he decided to make use of his acting and singing talent.

Busch first rose to prominence as an interpreter of political songs, particularly those of Kurt Tucholsky, in the Berlin Kabarett scene of the 1920s. He starred in the original 1928 production of Bertolt Brecht's Threepenny Opera, as well as the subsequent 1931 film by Georg Wilhelm Pabst. He also appeared in the movie Kuhle Wampe.

A lifelong communist, Busch fled Nazi Germany in 1933, accompanied by his wife, Eva Busch, and with the Gestapo on his heels, initially settling in the Netherlands.  By 1938 they had divorced, without acrimony, as their lives diverged. Eva settled in Paris while Ernst initially made his home in the Soviet Union where he worked with Gustav von Wangenheim on the 1935 film "Kämpfer" ("Fighters").  In 1937 he joined the International Brigades to fight against the Nationalists in Spain. His wartime songs were then recorded and broadcast by Radio Barcelona and Radio Madrid. After the Spanish Republic fell to General Franco, Busch migrated to Belgium where he was interned during the German occupation and later imprisoned in Camp Gurs, France and Berlin. Freed by the Red Army in 1945, he settled in East Berlin, where he acted in the first play to be produced in the American-occupied zone, Robert Ardrey's Thunder Rock. He would go on to start his own record label and work with Bertolt Brecht and Erwin Piscator at the "Berliner Ensemble". A beloved figure in the German Democratic Republic, he is best remembered for his performance in the title role of Brecht's Life of Galileo and his recordings of workers songs, including many written by Hanns Eisler. He also made a memorable recording of "Peat Bog Soldiers".

Recordings of Spanish Civil War songs (incomplete list)
From "Canciones de las Brigadas Internacionales" and "Solidarität".

Adelante Campesinos
Am Rio Jarama – "On the Jarama Front"
 / Lied von der XI Brigade – "Song of the XIth Brigade"
Los Campesinos – "The Peasants"
Las Compañías de Acero
Los Cuatro Generales
Himno de Riego / Riego Hymne – "Colonel Riego's Hymn"
Hans Beimler
Des Lied von der Einheitsfront''' / EinheitsfrontliedLied der Internationalen Brigaden' / Lied Der Interbrigaden – "Song of the International Brigades"Mamita MiaDie Moorsoldaten – "Peat Bog Soldiers"Nuestra Bandera – "Our Flag"Peter, Mein Kamerad – "Peter, My Comrade""Spaniens Himmel" or "Die Thälmann-Kolonne" – "Spain's Heaven" or "The Thälmann Battalion" (Page 30f)

Recordings of Second World War and other songs (incomplete list)Ach Ihr WegeAlle Waffen gegen HitlerAmi go home AufbauliedDie Armeen EuropasBallade von den SäckeschmeißernDer BarrikadenDank Euch Ihr SowjetsoldatenDas Lied vom SA-MannDiplomatenDer GrabenDer heimliche AufmarschEs Kommt der TagEinheitsfrontliedFrieden der WeltKämpfen wie LeninKampflied gegen den FaschismusKoreaLeninLied der BergarbeiterLied der InterbrigadenLied der ParteiLied des WerktätigenLied vom Adler StalinLied vom VaterlandLinker MarschLinks RechtsLob des KommunismusMarsch der AntifaschistenDer Marsch Ins Dritte ReichMatrosen von KronstadtDer rote WeddingSehnsucht nach der HeimatSolidaritätsliedStalin Freund GenosseTrotz alledemVorwärts BolschewikWir sind des Geyers schwarzer Haufen''

Awards, medals, and recognition

Germany's most prestigious school for stage acting and directing is named after the actor, the Ernst Busch Academy of Dramatic Arts (Hochschule für Schauspielkunst "Ernst Busch", HFS) in Berlin. Busch was awarded the Lenin Peace Prize for 1970–71.

Filmography

See also
 Pete Seeger (section 'Spanish Civil War songs')
 International Brigades order of battle (section 'XI International Brigade' point 'Songs')
 VEB Deutsche Schallplatten the state-run record label started by Busch in 1946

References

1900 births
1980 deaths
Musicians from Kiel
People from the Province of Schleswig-Holstein
Communist Party of Germany members
Socialist Unity Party of Germany members
German anti-fascists
German male stage actors
Spanish-language singers of Germany
20th-century German male actors
20th-century German male singers
Refugees from Nazi Germany in the Soviet Union
International Brigades personnel
German people of the Spanish Civil War
Ernst Busch Academy of Dramatic Arts
Recipients of the Patriotic Order of Merit in gold
Recipients of the Order of Friendship of Peoples
Lenin Peace Prize recipients
Recipients of the National Prize of East Germany
Actors from Kiel